Coleophora chrysanthemi is a moth of the family Coleophoridae. It is found from Finland to Italy and Hungary.

The adults are small brown moths with fringed wings and long antennae.

The larvae feed on a species of tansy, Tanacetum corymbosum. They create a tubular silken case with dark length ridges. Larvae can be found in the spring, up to April.

References

chrysanthemi
Moths described in 1869
Moths of Europe